The Kaohsiung Main Public Library is the central library of Kaohsiung, Taiwan. It is the main library of the Kaohsiung Public Library System and opened in November 2014. The building is located in Xinguang Road, opposite to the Tuntex Sky Tower.

History

The old main library of Kaohsiung at Minsheng Road opened in 1981. By 2011, it had gradually become unable to keep up with the demand of the public, and a project was initiated to build a new library building in the Asia New Bay Area, located in the city center. Architecture and design work were done by Ricky Liu and the Japanese architect Toyo Ito’s team. Construction started in October 2012 and was completed in 2014. Opening to the public in November of that year, it was hailed as a new cultural landmark for the city.

In 2017 the library was regarded as one of the top 10 landmarks of Taiwan by TripAdvisor.

Features
On the top floor it has integrated a subtropical garden landscape into its architecture. It is regarded as the world’s first column-suspended green building.

Gallery

Phase II

The second phase of the development plan started in 2016 and was completed in 2020.

The building includes a bookstore, restaurant, movie theater and a 238-room hotel. This BOT project accounts for the operating costs of the new library in the future, and provides accommodation and research facilities in the adjacent Kaohsiung Exhibition Center to form a cultural and creative industry cluster and create a cultural and creative industry in Kaohsiung.

References

External links

Kaohsiung Main Public Library Official Website (English version)
Kaohsiung Main Public Library at Kaohsiung Travel

2014 establishments in Taiwan
Buildings and structures in Kaohsiung
Education in Kaohsiung
Public libraries in Taiwan
Tourist attractions in Kaohsiung
Skyscrapers in Kaohsiung
Toyo Ito buildings